The Democratic Republic of the Congo competed at the 2004 Summer Olympics in Athens, Greece, from 13 to 29 August 2004.

Athletics 

Athletes from the Democratic Republic of the Congo have so far achieved qualifying standards in the following athletics events (up to a maximum of 3 athletes in each event at the 'A' Standard, and 1 at the 'B' Standard). 

Men

Women

Key
Note–Ranks given for track events are within the athlete's heat only
Q = Qualified for the next round
q = Qualified for the next round as a fastest loser or, in field events, by position without achieving the qualifying target
NR = National record
N/A = Round not applicable for the event
Bye = Athlete not required to compete in round

Table tennis

Democratic Republic of the Congo has qualified a spot in the men's doubles.

References

External links
 Official Report of the XXVIII Olympiad
 

Nations at the 2004 Summer Olympics
2004
Olympics